Hensley Athletic Field is primarily a track and field athletics field, home ground of the Randwick-Botany Little Athletics Club and the South Sydney Athletics Club, it is also used as a ground for association football in Sydney, Australia. The track was the first all weather synthetic athletics track in Australia when it was installed in 1973. 

It is now mainly used for school and association athletics, and association football and the NSW National Premier Leagues where it is the home ground for Dunbar Rovers NPL and Hakoah Sydney City East. The field has a capacity of 1,000 people.

History.

References

External links
Hensley Athletics Field listing on Athletics Track Directory
Official website of Randwick Botany Little Athletics Club
Official Website of Hakoah Sydney City East
Soccerway page

Soccer venues in Sydney
Rugby union stadiums in Australia
Rugby league stadiums in Australia
Sports venues in Sydney
Athletics in Australia